Born to Play Guitar is the 17th studio album by American blues musician Buddy Guy, released in 2015. It peaked at No. 60 on the Billboard 200 and reached No. 1 on the Billboard Blues Albums chart on August 22, 2015.

The album won the Grammy Award for Best Blues Album in 2016.

Musicians
 Buddy Guy - electric guitar, acoustic guitar, vocals
 Tom Hambridge - Drums, Percussion, Tambourine, Triangle, Wind Chimes, Background Vocals
 Doyle Bramhall II - 12 String Acoustic Guitar, Electric Guitar
 Rob McNelley - Electric Guitar, Resonator Guitar, Slide Guitar
 Kenny Greenberg - Electric Guitar
 Bob Britt - Electric Guitar, Resonator Guitar
 Billy Cox - Electric Bass
 Glenn Worf - Electric Bass, Upright Bass
 Michael Rhodes - Acoustic Bass, Electric Bass 
 Tommy Macdonald - Electric Bass
 Reese Wynans - Clavinet, Hammond B3, Grand Piano, Upright Piano, Wurlitzer
 Kevin McKendree - African Piano, Hammond B3, Piano
 Rob McKendree - Clavinet
 The McCrary Sisters - Background Vocals
 Chris Carmichael - strings, string arrangement

Guest Musicians
 Billy Gibbons - guitar, vocals
 Kim Wilson - harmonica
 Joss Stone - vocals
 Van Morrison - vocals

Personnel
 Tom Hambridge - Producer, Composer, Mixing
 Ducky Carlisle - Engineer, Mixing
 Michael Saint-Leon - Engineer
 Jonathan Joseph - Engineer
 Nathan James - Engineer
 Seth Morton - Assistant Engineer
 Roger Seibel - Mastering
 Erwin Gorostiza	Creative Director
 Tommy Macdonald - Production Assistant
 Gilbert Garza	- Guitar Technician
 Josh Cheuse	- Art Direction, Design, Photography
 Bradley Cook - Cover Photo

Track listing

Charts

References 

2015 albums
Buddy Guy albums
RCA Records albums
Albums produced by Tom Hambridge